Sunsbury Township is one of the eighteen townships of Monroe County, Ohio, United States. As of the 2010 census, the population was 1,325.

Geography
Located in the northern part of the county, it borders the following townships:
Washington Township, Belmont County - northeast
Switzerland Township - east
Adams Township - south
Center Township - southwest
Malaga Township - west
Wayne Township, Belmont County - northwest

Three villages are located in Sunsbury Township:
Beallsville, in the north
Part of Jerusalem, in the northwest, along the border with Malaga Township
Part of Wilson, in the northwest, along the border with Belmont County

Name and history
It is the only Sunsbury Township statewide.

Government
The township is governed by a three-member board of trustees, who are elected in November of odd-numbered years to a four-year term beginning on the following January 1. Two are elected in the year after the presidential election and one is elected in the year before it. There is also an elected township fiscal officer, who serves a four-year term beginning on April 1 of the year after the election, which is held in November of the year before the presidential election. Vacancies in the fiscal officership or on the board of trustees are filled by the remaining trustees.

References

External links
County website

Townships in Monroe County, Ohio
Townships in Ohio